Langzhou or Lang Prefecture may refer to:
 Langzhou (郎州), a former prefecture in roughly modern Qujing, Yunnan, China
 Langzhou (郎州), a former prefecture in roughly modern Zunyi, Guizhou, China
 Langzhou (閬州), a former prefecture in roughly modern Langzhong, Sichuan, China
 Langzhou (朗州), a former prefecture in roughly modern Changde, Hunan, China